Minuscule 415 (in the Gregory-Aland numbering), ε 421 (in the Soden numbering), is a Greek minuscule manuscript of the New Testament, on parchment. It is dated by a colophon to the year 1356. 
It has marginalia.

Description 

The codex contains a complete text of the four Gospels on 226 parchment leaves. The text is written in one column per page, in 27 lines per page.

Text 

The Greek text of the codex is a representative of the Byzantine text-type. Hermann von Soden classified it to the textual family Kr. Aland placed it in Category V.

According to the Claremont Profile Method it represents textual family Πb in Luke 1 (weak member) and family Πa in Luke 20 (weak member). In Luke 10 no profile was made.

History 

According to the colophon the manuscript was written in January, 1356. Wiedmann and J. G. J. Braun collated some portions of the manuscript for Scholz (1794-1852). The manuscript was added to the list of New Testament manuscripts by Scholz.
C. R. Gregory saw it in 1886.

The manuscript is currently housed at the Biblioteca Marciana (Gr. I. 22) in Venice.

See also 

 List of New Testament minuscules
 Biblical manuscript
 Textual criticism

References

Further reading 

 

Greek New Testament minuscules
14th-century biblical manuscripts
1356 works